Our Lady of Lourdes is a Roman Catholic parish church in Toronto, Ontario, Canada. It was founded in 1879 and served by the Society of Saint Vincent de Paul. Since 1969 it has been administered by the Society of Jesus on behalf of the Archdiocese of Toronto. It is located at 520 Sherbourne Street in Downtown Toronto. It was designed by Frederick Charles Law who modelled the church on the Basilica of Santa Maria del Popolo. In 1986, it was given a centennial plaque by Heritage Toronto.

History

Foundation
The church was founded in 1879. During that time the area was known as St. John’s Grove and was the site of the Archbishop of Toronto’s summer residence. In 1885, on the 25th anniversary of the episcopal ordination of John Joseph Lynch, the Archbishop of Toronto, the clergy of the archdiocese created a church next to the summer residence as a gift to the archbishop.

Construction
The church was designed by Frederick Charles Law and he built it in the Romanesque revival architectural style. He drew inspiration for the church's design on the Basilica of Santa Maria del Popolo in Rome. Part of the summer residence of the archbishop still exists as it forms part of the church's parish hall. On 28 October 1886 the church was opened.

In 1910, alterations were made to the church. The nave was added and the church of the summer residence became the sanctuary of Our Lady of Lourdes' Church.

Development
Over time the area changed dramatically and became a united, diversified, and a multicultural community in the Toronto Centre District. The biggest change was the creation of the St. James Town Community Projects. The church was originally affiliated with the Society of Saint Vincent de Paul, but, in part because these changes, the church was handed over to the Jesuits in 1969.

Parish
St. James Town is mostly populated by immigrants, foreign workers, international students, and tourists from different countries with various traditions and cultures and these groups form the majority of the parishioners who are from all walks of life. The church also hosts the local chapter of Dignity and celebrates Healing Mass every third Saturday of each month for the sick with cancer, autoimmune diseases, HIV, AIDS, and other illnesses. The ministry and hospitality welcome everyone regardless of race, nationality, creed, gender, age, sexual orientation, social-economic status, and others, as per the Human Rights Code of Canada. In this way, the church community strive to live out their Christian commitment and values in building the City of God for world peace, love, humility, compassion, social justice, hope, unity, and faith in God.

The church has seven Sunday Masses at 5:15pm on Saturday and at 8:30am, 10:00am, 11:30am, 1:00pm, 5:00pm (in Tamil) and at 7:00pm on Sunday.

See also
 Jesuits in Canada
 List of Jesuit sites
 List of Roman Catholic churches in Toronto

References

External links 

Roman Catholic churches in Toronto
Jesuit churches in Canada
Roman Catholic churches completed in 1879
19th-century Roman Catholic church buildings in Canada
Religious organizations established in 1884
Roman Catholic churches in Ontario
Roman Catholic Archdiocese of Toronto
Neoclassical church buildings in Canada